Gambling with Souls is a 1936 American exploitation film directed by Elmer Clifton.

Cast
Martha Chapin as Mrs. Mae Miller
Wheeler Oakman as Lucky Wilder
Bryant Washburn as "Million Dollar" Taylor
Gay Sheridan as Carolyn
Vera Steadman as Molly Murdock
Edward Keane as Attorney
Robert Frazer as Dr. John Miller
Gaston Glass as Officer
Florence Dudley as Jean
Eddie Laughton as Nick

External links

1936 films
1936 crime drama films
1930s exploitation films
American black-and-white films
American crime drama films
American exploitation films
1930s English-language films
Films about prostitution in the United States
Films directed by Elmer Clifton
Films about gambling
1930s American films